Domaljevac is a village located in Domaljevac-Šamac municipality in Posavina Canton of the Federation of Bosnia and Herzegovina, an entity of Bosnia and Herzegovina.

Demographics 
According to the 2013 census, its population was 3,295.

References

Populated places in Domaljevac